Herbert Bauch (born 18 May 1957 in Berlin) is a retired boxer, who represented East Germany at the 1980 Summer Olympics in Moscow, Soviet Union. There he won the bronze medal in the light heavyweight division (– 81 kg), after being defeated in the semifinals by eventual gold medalist Slobodan Kačar of Yugoslavia. Two years earlier he captured the bronze medal at the second World Championships in Belgrade.

1980 Olympic results 
Below are the results of Herbert Bauch, an East German light heavyweight boxer who competed at the 1980 Moscow Olympics:

 Round of 16: Defeated Bozhidar Ivanov (Bulgaria) by decision, 5–0
 Quarterfinal: Defeated Benny Pike (Australia) by a second-round knockout
 Semifinal Lost to Slobodan Kačar (Yugoslavia) referee stopped contest in the second round (was awarded a bronze medal)

References
 
 

1957 births
Living people
People from East Berlin
Boxers from Berlin
Light-heavyweight boxers
Boxers at the 1980 Summer Olympics
Olympic boxers of East Germany
Olympic bronze medalists for East Germany
Olympic medalists in boxing
Medalists at the 1980 Summer Olympics
German male boxers
AIBA World Boxing Championships medalists